Mladen Munjaković (born 20 July 1961) is a Croatian retired footballer.

Career
Munjaković began his career with NK Dinamo Zagreb in the Yugoslav First League, where he won the league in the 1981–82 season and the Yugoslav Cup in 1983. He totalled 430 games for the club, but missed a big part of their league title winning season due to him joining the army.

Munjaković went abroad in 1988, joining SK Rapid Wien in the Austrian Football Bundesliga. He later played for Levante UD in the Spanish Segunda División and Segesta.

Personal life
Munjaković hails from Žerjavinac, a small village near Sesvete and is married to Natali Lokin. They have a daughter, Tena.

References

External sources
 
http://www.bdfutbol.com/j/j9255.html
http://gnkdinamopovijest.blogspot.com/2011/05/momcad-po-sezonama.html
http://forum.b92.net/topic/29741-ex-yu-fudbalska-statistika-po-godinama/page__st__75

1961 births
Living people
People from Zagreb County
Association football defenders
Yugoslav footballers
Croatian footballers
GNK Dinamo Zagreb players
SK Rapid Wien players
NK Olimpija Ljubljana (1945–2005) players
Levante UD footballers
HNK Segesta players
Yugoslav First League players
Austrian Football Bundesliga players
Segunda División players
Croatian Football League players
Yugoslav expatriate footballers
Expatriate footballers in Austria
Yugoslav expatriate sportspeople in Austria
Croatian expatriate footballers
Expatriate footballers in Spain
Yugoslav expatriate sportspeople in Spain
Croatian expatriate sportspeople in Spain